Gangshan South is a terminus on the Red line of Kaohsiung MRT in Gangshan District, Kaohsiung City, Taiwan. The station is an at-grade station. It is located in the KMRT North Depot.

Around the station
 Agongdian River
 Republic of China Air Force Academy
 Republic of China Air Force Museum
 Museum of Shadow Puppets
 Showtime Live Gangshan
 Liucuo Park
 Gangshan Riverside Park
 Dianbao River Wetlands (典寶溪濕地)

References

External links
 KRTC Gangshan South Station

2012 establishments in Taiwan
Kaohsiung Metro Red line stations
Railway stations opened in 2012